Kıca (also known as Kıcaköy) is a village in Silifke district of Mersin Province, Turkey. At  it is situated in the Toros Mountains. The population of Kıca  was 429  as of 2011.

References

Villages in Silifke District